821 Naval Air Squadron was a Royal Navy Fleet Air Arm carrier based squadron formed on 3 April 1933 with the transferral and amalgamation of the Fairey III aircraft from 446 and half of 455 Flight (Fleet Spotter Reconnaissance) Flights Royal Air Force to the newly formed Fleet Air Arm of the Royal Air Force. The squadron operated during the Second World War.

History

Pre-war
The squadron was upgraded to use the Fairey Seal aircraft, and then embarked aboard  with the Home Fleet in May 1933. The Abyssinian crisis in August 1935 caused the squadron to be briefly transferred to the Mediterranean, but it returned to the UK in February 1936. It then transferred its Seals to 822 Naval Air Squadron and received as replacements Blackburn Shark IIs, which it used to take up the role of Torpedo Spotter Reconnaissance. By September 1937 the Sharks had been replaced by Fairey Swordfish and the Squadron transferred to the new aircraft carrier  in November 1938.  They sailed to the Mediterranean in spring 1939, and as war loomed they were transferred to Admiralty control on 24 May 1939.

Second World War
Operating off Ark Royal the squadron was responsible for the first allied U-boat kill of the war, when they sank , after she had unsuccessfully tried to torpedo Ark Royal. The squadron sailed with the carrier to the South Atlantic and Indian Ocean, searching for German shipping and commerce raiders. After briefly operating in the Mediterranean, the German invasion of Norway in April 1940 caused Ark Royal to be recalled to support allied operations in Norway. The squadron sustained heavy losses in this unsuccessful operation and was forced to disband in December. A single flight, X Flight, continued in service though, with six aircraft. They sailed to Gibraltar aboard  and then to Malta aboard HMS Ark Royal. They covered the Malta Convoys, before being absorbed in 815 Naval Air Squadron.

821 Squadron was re-formed at Detling in July 1941, initially tasked with carrying out anti-submarine duties in Orkney. In November they were transferred to Egypt, and in March 1942 they were re-equipped with six Fairey Albacores. They carried out bombing raids on Rhodes, and in Egypt were active in supporting ground forces at Maaten Bagush, Gambut and Daba. 821 Squadron was transferred again in November 1942 to operate out of RAF Hal Far, on Malta, attacking enemy supply convoys headed to North Africa. Four of the squadron's aircraft were transferred to Castel Benito, Tripoli in March 1943 to support night bombing raids by the Royal Air Force in Libya. In July 1943 at the time of Operation Husky, 821 squadron was based at Hal Far on Malta with Albacores for torpedo/spotter/reconnaissance. The entire squadron then transferred to Tunis in June to attack enemy shipping. 821 Squadron returned to the UK by October and was disbanded again.

It reformed again in May 1944, this time equipped with 12 Fairey Barracuda IIs and operating as a torpedo bomber reconnaissance squadron.  The squadron was embarked aboard  in November and sailed to the Far East. They carried out mine-laying operations in February 1945, with Barracuda IIIs, and from April with six F4F Wildcats until June 1945. The squadron was active until February 1946.

Notes

References
 821 Squadron's pre war history
 821 Squadron's wartime history

Military units and formations established in 1933
800 series Fleet Air Arm squadrons